Versar, Inc. is a project management company providing technical and management support to government and companies in the world. The company was founded on July 14, 1969. The company operates in three segments including Engineering and Construction Management, Environmental Services, and Professional Services. It offers project scoping/development, cost estimation, construction oversight through Engineering and Construction Management. The company offers environmental solutions through Environmental Services. The company offers solid waste management, water program management, staff augmentation through Professional Services.

History
In 1969, Versar, Inc. was founded in Springfield, Virginia.
In January 2014, the company selected Locus Technologies (Locus) Environmental Information Management (EIM) software to be the preferred environmental data management system. In February 2014, the Company completed the acquisition of  Lime Energy, Inc.'s Facility Repair and Renewal (FRR) business unit.

In November 2017, Versar was acquired by Kingswood Capital Management for $1.6 million.

References

Construction and civil engineering companies of the United States
Companies based in Virginia
American companies established in 1969
Construction and civil engineering companies established in 1969
1969 establishments in Virginia
Companies formerly listed on the New York Stock Exchange